Panasonic Lumix DMC-3D1 is a digital camera by Panasonic Lumix. The highest-resolution pictures it records is 12.1 megapixels, through its 25mm Lumix DC VARIO x2.

Property
Stabilized 2-Lens System, 25mm Wide
4X Zoom with MEGA O.I.S.
3D and 2D Video and Stills with Dual Shooting Options
3.5-inch Touch Enabled LCD 
1080/60i HD Video

References

External links

DMC-3D1K on shop.panasonic.com
Panasonic Lumix DMC-3D1 Review

Point-and-shoot cameras
3D1